The 2022 Pacific hurricane season was a fairly active Pacific hurricane season, with nineteen named storms (including two that crossed over from the Atlantic), ten hurricanes, and four major hurricanes forming. The season officially began on May 15 in the Eastern Pacific, and on June 1 in the Central Pacific; both ended on November 30. These dates historically describe the period each year when most tropical cyclogenesis occurs in these regions of the Pacific and are adopted by convention.

The first named storm of the season, Hurricane Agatha, formed on May 28, and made landfall two days later at Category 2 strength on the Saffir–Simpson scale, making it the strongest hurricane on record to make landfall during the month of May in the Eastern Pacific basin. In June, Hurricane Blas and Tropical Storm Celia caused heavy rainfall over southwestern Mexico despite remaining offshore. The season's first major hurricane, Hurricane Bonnie, entered into the basin from the Atlantic on July 2, after crossing Nicaragua as a tropical storm, becoming the first storm to survive the crossover from the Atlantic to the Pacific since Hurricane Otto in 2016. In September, tropical storms Javier, Lester, and Madeline all caused flooding across the Pacific coast of Mexico, though none left severe damage. Hurricane Kay also formed that month, and struck the Baja California Peninsula before bringing gale-force winds to the west coast of the continental United States, becoming the first Pacific hurricane to do so since Hurricane Nora 25 years earlier. In early October, Hurricane Orlene became a Category 4 hurricane before weakening and making landfall in Sinaloa as a Category 1 hurricane, resulting in heavy rainfall and flooding. Also, Hurricane Julia became the second storm of the season to cross over from the Atlantic basin intact, and made landfall in El Salvador soon thereafter. In late October, Hurricane Roslyn became the fourth major hurricane of the season and was the strongest landfalling Pacific hurricane since Hurricane Patricia in 2015. Altogether, six named storms made landfall during the season.


Seasonal forecasts 

Forecasts include weekly and monthly changes in important factors that help determine the number of tropical storms, hurricanes, and major hurricanes within a particular year. According to the National Oceanic and Atmospheric Administration (NOAA), the average hurricane season in the Eastern and Central Pacific between 1991 and 2020 contained approximately 15 tropical storms, 8 hurricanes, and 4 major hurricanes. The NOAA generally classifies a season as above average, average, or below average based on the cumulative ACE index, but occasionally the number of tropical storms, hurricanes, and major hurricanes within a hurricane season is also considered. Factors they expected to reduce activity were near- or below-average sea surface temperatures across the eastern Pacific and the El Niño–Southern Oscillation remaining in the neutral phase, with the possibility of a La Niña developing, corresponding to a low chance of an El Niño.

On May 17, 2022, the Servicio Meteorológico Nacional (SMN) issued its forecast for the season, predicting a total of 14–19 named storms, 6–9 hurricanes, and 2–4 major hurricanes to develop. On May 24, 2022, the National Oceanic and Atmospheric Administration (NOAA) issued their outlook, calling for a below-normal season with 10–17 named storms, 4–8 hurricanes, 0–3 major hurricanes, and an accumulated cyclone energy index of 45% to 100% of the median.

Seasonal summary 

The season began with the formation and development of Hurricane Agatha on May 28, which rapidly intensified to a high-end Category 2 hurricane before making landfall along the coast of southwestern Mexico two days later. This marked the strongest Pacific hurricane to make landfall during the month of May since records began in 1949. Activity continued into June with the formation of Hurricane Blas, which caused four deaths while offshore of southwestern Mexico, and Tropical Storm Celia, which meandered across the basin for twelve days in late June. Four days after Celia dissipated, Tropical Storm Bonnie became the first to survive the crossover from the Atlantic to the Pacific since Hurricane Otto in 2016. It also became the season's first major hurricane. The same day Bonnie dissipated, the depression that would become Hurricane Darby formed. The storm rapidly intensified into the strongest storm of the season late on July 11, attaining sustained winds of  while moving out to sea. Several days later, Hurricane Estelle formed and paralleled the coast of Mexico. After a brief period without any active tropical cyclones, Hurricane Frank and Tropical Storm Georgette formed later in the month. They were followed by two systems during the first half of August, Hurricane Howard and Tropical Storm Ivette.

Six systems developed during September, the peak of the season. Tropical Storm Javier and then Hurricane Kay both formed off the coast of southwestern Mexico during the first week of the month and paralleled the coast offshore. Kay, the longer-lived and stronger of the two, became the first tropical cyclone to extend its effects northward into Southern California since Nora in 1997. This pace of storm development continued with the mid-month formations of tropical storms Lester and Madeline, which caused flooding and a combined 4 fatalities in Mexico, after Lester made landfall there and Madeline passed closely offshore. Madeline's dissipation was closely followed by the formation of Tropical Storm Newton and then Hurricane Orlene to close out the month.

October began with Tropical Storm Paine, a weak and short-lived system that remained away from land. Shortly thereafter, Hurricane Julia became the second storm of the season to cross over into the Pacific basin intact from the Atlantic. Not since 1996 has more than one storm crossed between the Atlantic and Pacific basins intact during a single season. Later in the month, Hurricane Roslyn paralleled the coast of Western Mexico before making landfall in Nayarit with  winds. No named storms formed in the month of November for the first time since 2017.

The accumulated cyclone energy (ACE) index for the 2022 Pacific hurricane season, as calculated by Colorado State University using data from the NHC, was 116.5 units. This level of activity was near the long-term (1991–2020) average. Broadly speaking, ACE is a measure of the power of a tropical or subtropical storm multiplied by the length of time it existed. An ACE number represents sum of the squares of the maximum sustained wind speed (knots) for all named storms while they are at least tropical storm intensity, divided by 10,000. Therefore, tropical depressions are not included.

Systems

Hurricane Agatha

Beginning on May 17, convection began to increase with the intertropical convergence zone stretching from the southwestern Caribbean Sea into the East Pacific basin. An area of low pressure soon developed and further organized into the season's first tropical depression to the south-southwest of the Mexico coastline early on May 28. Within hours, it strengthened into Tropical Storm Agatha. The newly-formed storm moved erratically during its early stages but eventually curved to the northeast. A very favorable environment allowed the system to begin a prolonged period of rapid intensification on May 29; it became the season's first hurricane during the early morning hours and reached its peak intensity at Category 2 strength with winds of 110 mph (175 km/h) by the afternoon. An increase in westerly wind shear and the onset of an eyewall replacement cycle temporarily caused the hurricane to weaken. However, it regained some strength on approach to the coastline of Mexico, and it moved onshore near La Redonda with 105 mph (165 km/h) winds around 21:00 UTC on May 30. The system's center decayed over land and dissipated on June 1 as it became absorbed in developing Tropical Storm Alex to the northeast.

Storm surge near where Agatha's core made landfall caused beach erosion and some additional damage. Strong winds caused additional damage to infrastructure. Agatha killed nine people, all in the Sierra Madre del Sur, and six others remained missing.

Hurricane Blas

An area of disturbed weather formed within the monsoon trough a couple of hundred miles offshore the coast of southern Mexico on June 10. The system slowly organized while it moved west, developing into Tropical Storm Blas at 06:00 UTC on June 14. Weak steering currents directed the system to curve north-northeast before sending it back westward. Blas tracked within an environment of warm sea surface temperatures and low to moderate wind shear, allowing it to rapidly become a hurricane on June 15 and reach peak winds of 85 miles per hour (140 km/h) that afternoon as it displayed a well-defined inner core structure. Increasing shear caused the hurricane to fluctuate in intensity through June 17, until cold waters led to a sustained weakening phase. At 18:00 UTC on June 19, Blas degenerated to a remnant low to the southwest of the Baja California peninsula. It continued west until dissipating on June 23.

Moisture from Blas combined with a nearby tropical wave interacted with the mountainous terrain of southwestern Mexico, resulting in heavy rainfall along the coast despite the hurricane remaining well offshore. This rain led to river flooding, flash flooding, and landslides, particularly across the states of Michoacán and Guerrero. A couple of dozen vehicles were stranded in flooded neighborhoods near Acapulco, where a sinkhole was reported on the Acapulco-Zihuatanejo Bypass. The bodies of two individuals were discovered near the city, but their cause of death is unknown, as is any possible relation with the hurricane. A few trees, fences, and utility poles were downed by gusty winds. Along the coast, large waves and rough surf resulted in minor beach erosion. Overall damage, though, was relatively minimal.

Tropical Storm Celia

A tropical wave departed Africa on June 5 and entered the East Pacific a week later, where it interacted with the active monsoon trough and the favorable phase of the Madden–Julian oscillation (MJO). Persistent thunderstorms spawned a broad area of low pressure, and both the low and associated convection organized over subsequent days. On June 16, the disturbance developed into a tropical depression; the next day, it intensified into Tropical Storm Celia. The new system moved unusually in its initial stages as it interacted with a cyclonic gyre established nearby, conducting a counter-clockwise curve before moving more definitively toward the west-northwest. Celia's intensity fluctuated for many days as it lost and regained convection in a moderate wind shear environment. On June 24, the cyclone reached peak winds of 60 mph (95 km/h) in spite of a sprawling, disorganized core structure. Celia soon entered colder waters and drier air, causing it to degenerate to a remnant low on June 28 after an unusually long stint as an early season tropical cyclone. The low finally dissipated well west of the Baja California peninsula on June 30.

While stalled off the coast of Central America, Celia interacted with a nearby low-pressure system which brought heavy rainfall to western Guatemala, affecting over 28,000 people. One death has been attributed to Celia. It occurred in Oaxaca, where a man drowned.

Hurricane Bonnie

At around 15:00 UTC on July 2, Tropical Storm Bonnie emerged into the Eastern Pacific from the Atlantic basin after crossing Nicaragua. Bonnie steadily reorganized as it moved westward away from the coast. Satellite images from later on July 2, revealed the storm to have a deep convective curved band with  cloud tops enveloping its west side. This strengthening trend continued, and by the end of the next day, the primary band had become wrapped completely around the center and an inner core was developing. By early on July 5, Bonnie's inner core structure had become well-developed with a  eye. As a result, the hurricane was able to reach Category 3 strength by 15:00 UTC that day. Beginning several hours afterward and continuing into July 6, Bonnie's cloud pattern deteriorated and the central convection became less organized due to moderate north-northeasterly shear, causing it to weaken to Category 2 strength. Then, on July 9, Bonnie degenerated into a post-tropical low as all deep convection within ceased.

Hurricane Darby

A tropical wave emerged off Africa on June 26–27 and entered the East Pacific by July 6. The disturbance became gradually better organized as it moved west to west-northwest away from the Mexico coastline, becoming a tropical depression early on July 9 and intensifying into Tropical Storm Darby later that day. Dry air briefly interrupted the storm's intensification, but Darby quickly rebounded and rapidly intensified into a hurricane on July 11. In a 24-hour period ending at 00:00 UTC on July 12, the cyclone strengthened from a 75 mph (120 km/h) hurricane to a 140 mph (220 km/h) Category 4 cyclone, its peak intensity. The storm displayed characteristics of an annular hurricane and was exceptionally small, with hurricane-force winds only extending about 10 mi (15 km) from the center. The system fluctuated in intensity until it encountered a more hostile environment in the Central Pacific basin. The combination of strong wind shear and colder waters caused Darby to dissipate into a trough early on July 17 while located southwest of Hawaii's Big Island.

Hurricane Estelle

On July 7, the NHC began monitoring the southeastern Pacific south of the coast of Central America, where a low pressure area was expected to form within a few days. The anticipated disturbance formed on July 11, far south of the coasts of Guatemala and El Salvador, producing some disorganized showers. By July 15, the disturbance had become sufficiently organized to be classified as a tropical depression by the NHC. By 03:00 UTC on July 16, the depression had strengthened, with a well defined low-level structure and a tight band of persistent deep convection near the center, and was upgraded to Tropical Storm Estelle. Then, after being hindered by northeasterly shear later that same day, intense convection was able to wrapped completely around the center and Estelle rapidly intensified into a hurricane by 03:00 UTC on July 17. The gradual weakening continued, and at 09:00 UTC on July 19, Estelle was downgraded to a tropical storm when its center was located just north of Clarion Island. Estelle's upper-level cloud shield became more symmetric later that day, due to reduced wind shear and increased convection that had wrapped around the storm's northern region. By 15:00 UTC on July 21, however, the storm had weakened to a tropical depression as it moved west-northwestward over the open ocean. Later that day the system became a remnant low.

Though Estelle remained well off shore, heavy rains were reported in coastal areas of Baja California Sur, Jalisco, Nayarit and Sinaloa, causing localized flooding and landslides. This was later determined by the National Hurricane Center to have not been from Estelle saying, “there were no reports of damage or casualties associated with Estelle.”

Hurricane Frank

On July 21, the NHC began forecasting that an area of low pressure would develop off the southern coasts of El Salvador and Guatemala within a few days. An area of low pressure, associated with a tropical wave, developed two days later, producing disorganized showers and thunderstorms. At 09:00 UTC on July 26, after deep convection developed at the center of the disturbance and become better organized, it was designated as a tropical depression. Convection near the storm's center struggled to organize due to northeasterly wind shear as the storm moved westward. The shear persisted through early on July 28. Once the shear diminished sufficiently, the storm was able to strengthen, with deep convection becoming more symmetric around the center and banding features becoming well established by late the next day. Frank consequently intensified into a hurricane by 03:00 UTC on July 30. It then began to weaken as a result, and fell to tropical storm strength early on August 1. Later, it ceased producing organized deep convection and degenerated into a post-tropical cyclone during the following day.

Tropical Storm Georgette

On July 25, the NHC began monitoring an area of low pressure located southwest of the coast of southwestern Mexico for possible tropical development. The disturbance continued to become better organized and was designated as a tropical depression at 09:00 UTC on July 27. Six hours later, the depression strengthened into a compact Tropical Storm Georgette. The system remained relatively unchanged in strength during the next couple of days, though by early on July 29, its cloud pattern had become more symmetric with a well-developed rain band in the north part of the storm, and its sustained winds reached . Then, moving slowly westward, the storm waned over the next couple days, due in part to strong easterly shear generated by the outflow from the circulation of Hurricane Frank, and weakened to a tropical depression on the afternoon of July 31. Then, during the afternoon of August 3, Georgette degenerated into a remnant low over the open ocean.

Hurricane Howard

On August 2, the NHC began monitoring a tropical wave producing widespread showers and thunderstorms over Central America and the adjacent waters in anticipation that an area of low pressure would form once it moved over the eastern Pacific. The anticipated low developed two days later off the coasts of Guatemala and southern Mexico. By August 6, the disturbance had become sufficiently organized to be classified as a tropical depression by the NHC. Beset by dry air imported to the depression's center by moderate wind shear, the depression was unable to quickly intensify. On the afternoon of August 7, the depression was upgraded to Tropical Storm Howard as convection began to build over the northern semicircle of the system, though the low-level circulation remained partially exposed to the south due to continuing wind shear. The storm continued to organize into the following day, and became a Category 1 hurricane at 21:00 UTC on August 8, as an eye surrounded by deepening convective banding formed. On August 9, Howard's sustained winds reached  as it moved west-northwestward, before weakening to a tropical storm at 03:00 UTC on August 10. The remaining deep convection near Howard's center ceased by the middle of that same day, and the storm later degenerated into a post-tropical low.

That same day, the port of Mazatlán was closed to smaller vessels due to large waves. No coastal watches or warnings were issued for the storm.

Tropical Storm Ivette

On August 7, the NHC began forecasting that an area of low pressure with a potential for tropical cyclogenesis would develop within a few days off the southwestern coast of Mexico. The low developed late the next day, producing disorganized showers and thunderstorms. It gradually become better defined, and on the afternoon of August 13, was classified as a tropical depression. It tracked over warm ocean waters, but there was little improvement in its structure due to moderate to strong east-northeasterly shear, until an unexpected burst of convection during the afternoon of August 15 resulted in the intensification of the depression into Tropical Storm Ivette.  But within a few hours however, that burst was shearing away to the west and Ivette soon weakened back to a tropical depression. The system then degenerated into a remnant low on August 16.

Tropical Storm Javier

On August 29, the NHC noted that an area of disturbed weather had formed a few hundred miles south of Acapulco, Mexico. The low gradually organized, developing a low-level circulation on August 31. Then, fueled by increasing deep convection over the depression's western region and near its center, the system strengthened into Tropical Storm Javier early the next day, though its circulation remained somewhat elongated. Later that same day however, the storm crossed over cooler waters and began to weaken. Javier became a post-tropical cyclone on September 4, while moving out to sea.

Rainbands of Javier brought heavy rain and wind gusts to the southern Baja California peninsula as it passed offshore.

Hurricane Kay

On August 30, the NHC noted that an area of disturbed weather had formed a few hundred miles south of Acapulco, Guerrero. This disturbance became organized as a tropical depression on September 4, and strengthened into Tropical Storm Kay later that same day. The storm continued to intensify, and on the morning of September 5, became a Category 1 hurricane. Then, while moving north-northwestward early on September 7, Kay intensified into a Category 2 hurricane. This intensification proved short-lived however, as the cloud tops surrounding Kay's eye warmed and its overall cloud pattern became less organized and somewhat elongated later that same day, resulting in the hurricane weakening to Category 1 strength. Kay made landfall along the central Baja California peninsula coast with  winds on September 8, then weakened to a tropical storm, before moving back over the ocean.

In addition to flooding, the hurricane was also responsible for three deaths in Guerrero. Before the storm hit, over 1,600 people evacuated to shelters according to Baja California Sur state officials. Road and agricultural damage in Baja California Sur exceeded 72 million pesos (US$3.6 million). Kay's outer bands also hit Southern California and southwest Arizona, bringing wind gusts of near  to some areas, primarily in San Diego County, California. Flash flooding closed numerous roads in both states; in Imperial County, California, falling boulders impeded traffic along a stretch of I-8. The rainfall was beneficial to crews in Riverside County, California, battling the Fairview Fire, as it mitigated some of the threat posed by the high winds and dry conditions.

Tropical Storm Lester

A trough of low pressure producing disorganized showers and thunderstorms extending from the Gulf of Tehuantepec westward to near the southern coast of Mexico formed on September 11. The low remained disorganized near the southern coast of Mexico for the next few days before showing initial signs of organization early on September 15. By 21:00 UTC that same day, the circulation around the center of the low had become better defined and a curved band of convection had formed over the western and southwestern areas of the circulation. In light of these developments the system was designated Tropical Depression Thirteen-E. Surface wind speeds in portions of the circulation increased overnight, and therefore the depression was upgraded to Tropical Storm Lester at 09:00 UTC on September 16, even though it still had a sheared appearance. The storm became somewhat better organized late that day, but this improvement proved fleeting, due in part to its close proximity to the coast. Lester weakened to a tropical depression as it made landfall east of Acapulco on the afternoon of September 17, and then rapidly dissipated inland.

As the storm approached, ports in Guerrero were closed due to high waves of 13 ft.(4 m) in some areas. Also, nearly 600 emergency shelters were opened in preparation for evacuations due to imminent threat of rivers and streams overflowing. Lester caused damage throughout much of Guerrero as its heavy rains caused flooding and mudslides. One person in Marquelia Municipality died when swept away by water currents. The most severe damage occurred in Coyuca de Benítez, where over 700 houses were flooded. Additionally, towns in Acatepec, in the state's mountain region, were left isolated due a washed-out roadway.

Tropical Storm Madeline

On September 12, the NHC began monitoring for potential development an small area of low pressure located off the coast of southwestern Mexico producing limited showers and thunderstorms. After several days, the disturbance became sufficiently organized on September 17, to be classified as Tropical Storm Madeline. After this, however, the storm strengthened very little though much of the next day due to deep-layer easterly shear. Later that same day, Madeline began to weaken, becoming first a tropical depression and then a remnant low on September 20.

Two deaths were attributed to Madeline as it moved along the coast of southwest Mexico, with one person remaining missing. Several coastal states were hit by heavy rains, strong winds and rough surf from the storm.

Tropical Storm Newton

A small area of low pressure formed near the coast of southwestern Mexico on September 20. Rain and thunderstorm activity within the disturbance quickly became better organized, resulting in the formation of Tropical Depression Fifteen-E at 21:00 UTC on September 21, and then of Tropical Storm Newton less than four hours later. Later that day however, the convection at the storm's center collapsed suddenly, and although it briefly recovered, Newton began to weaken again the next morning as it passed near Socorro Island. It became a tropical depression on September 24, then degenerated into a remnant low one day later. For several days afterward, through September 29, the NHC continued monitoring Newton's remnants for possible regeneration, and its associated shower activity briefly become slightly better organized on September 28, before being stymied by increasingly unfavorable conditions.

Hurricane Orlene

On September 26, the NHC noted that a low pressure area had formed south of the southwestern Mexico coast within an environment conducive for gradual tropical development. Shower and thunderstorm activity associated with this low increased the following day, and it steadily gained organization on September 28; the system developed a well-defined center late that day, becoming a tropical depression. The next day, as the storm moved northward along the edge of a ridge over central Mexico, it generated a few bursts of deep convection and developed a small inner core with a curved band to the south. Orlene intensified into a Category 1 hurricane at 15:00 UTC on October 1, and to Category 2 strength about eight hours later. Wind shear from the southwest began to adversely affect the system soon thereafter, weakening it to a Category 3 hurricane six hours later, and then to Category 2 that night as it passed over the Islas Marías. The system rapidly weakened inland, becoming a tropical depression by 21:00 UTC that same day, and then dissipating over the Sierra Madre mountains several hours after that.

Orlene brought heavy rain to several states in Western Mexico, which resulted in widespread flooding and several mudslides in Sinaloa and Nayarit, but there were no casualties reported as the storm moved through. Damage in San Blas, Nayarit was over 12 million pesos (US$600,000).

Tropical Storm Paine

Shower and thunderstorm activity within the disturbance increased and began showing signs of becoming organized on October 1, and satellite imagery the following day indicated that its surface circulation had become better defined. These trends continued, resulting in the formation of Tropical Storm Paine on October 3. This was fleeting however, and by the time the storm passed near Clarion Island early on October 5, it was devoid of deep convection. Later that same day, Paine degenerated into a remnant low.

Tropical Storm Julia

It maintained a band of deep convection over the southern and eastern portions of its circulation, the areas not still interacting with the mountainous terrain inland. Later that same day, Julia degenerated into an open trough overland.

While an Atlantic hurricane and then tropical storm, Julia's heavy rains caused widespread life-threatening flash floods and deadly mudslides throughout Central America; several storm related fatalities were reported across the region. Torrential rain continued to fall in northwestern Central America as Julia moved inland from the Pacific.

Hurricane Roslyn

On October 16, the NHC began monitoring an area of disturbed weather south of the southern coast of Mexico. Thunderstorm activity increased and became better organized within the disturbance over the next few days, and the low's circulation become increasingly better defined as well. This trend continued, and early on October 20, it developed into Tropical Depression Nineteen-E. Soon thereafter, the depression strengthened into Tropical Storm Roslyn. Roslyn quickly lost intensity after hitting Mexico.

The rains and winds associated with Roslyn left four people dead in the state of Nayarit.

Storm names 

The following names were used for named storms that formed in the northeastern Pacific Ocean during 2022. Retired names, if any, will be announced by the World Meteorological Organization during the joint 45th Sessions of the RA IV Hurricane Committee in the spring of 2023. The names not retired from this list will be used again in the 2028 season. This is the same list used in the 2016 season.

For storms that form in the Central Pacific Hurricane Center's area of responsibility, encompassing the area between 140 degrees west and the International Date Line, four rotating lists of Hawaiian names are used one after the other without regard to year. The next four names that were scheduled for use in 2022 are shown below. However, none of them were used.

Season effects 
This is a table of all the storms in the 2022 Pacific hurricane season. It includes their duration (within the basin), names, areas affected, damages, and death totals. Deaths in parentheses are additional and indirect (an example of an indirect death would be a traffic accident), but were still related to that storm. Damage and deaths include totals while the storm was extratropical, a tropical wave, or a low, and all the damage figures are in 2022 USD.

See also 
 Weather of 2022
 Tropical cyclones in 2022
 Pacific hurricane
 List of Pacific hurricane records
 2022 Atlantic hurricane season
 2022 Pacific typhoon season
 2022 North Indian Ocean cyclone season
 South-West Indian Ocean cyclone seasons: 2021–22, 2022–23
 Australian region cyclone seasons: 2021–22, 2022–23
 South Pacific cyclone seasons: 2021–22, 2022–23

Notes

References

External links 

National Hurricane Center and Central Pacific Hurricane Center (website)
Servicio Meteorológico Nacional (website, in Spanish)
Joint Typhoon Warning Center (website)

2022
2022 Epac